Streptomyces luridus is a bacterium species from the genus of Streptomyces. Streptomyces luridus produces luridin.

See also 
 List of Streptomyces species

References

Further reading

External links
Type strain of Streptomyces luridus at BacDive -  the Bacterial Diversity Metadatabase	

luridus
Bacteria described in 1961